The London Borough of Hackney is a Labour Party governed inner London borough. There are currently fifty-seven seats representing twenty-one wards in the Borough. They are divided between the Labour Party with fifty; the Conservative Party with four, and Liberal Democrats three.

The Borough consists of two parliamentary constituencies: Hackney North and Stoke Newington (represented by Diane Abbott) and Hackney South and Shoreditch (represented by Meg Hillier; both Labour Party Members of Parliament). The Borough is a constituent part of the North East London Assembly seat with the London Borough of Islington and London Borough of Waltham Forest currently held by Jennette Arnold AM. The Borough was a constituent part of the London constituency of the European Parliament until Brexit in 2020.

Current structure
The borough is one of a number of local authorities and urban areas in the UK that has a directly elected mayor. Hackney's mayor is also the political leader of the council and is supported by a cabinet, a speaker and deputy speaker and directly elected councillors (from whom the cabinet and speakers are appointed).

The borough's first directly elected mayor was former local councillor Jules Pipe CBE who was returned in three successive elections before resigning in take up the position of Deputy Mayor of London for Planning, under Mayor of London, Sadiq Khan. Hackney's second directly elected mayor is another former councillor, Philip Glanville, who was elected in September 2016. Both mayors were elected as candidates for the Labour Party. The Speaker for the 2017-18 Municipal year is Councillor Soraya Adejare; who fulfils the civic and ceremonial duties previously undertaken by the civic mayor.

The borough is currently divided into twenty-one wards; fifteen return three councillors and the remaining six return two councillors in a first past the post system of elections.

The Mayor of Hackney selects approximately nine councillors to make up a cabinet who take responsibility of the governance of the Borough's civil service, and represent the mayor and council on strategic bodies such as Team Hackney, the Arms Length Management Organisation (ALMO) Hackney Homes which manages the Borough's housing estates, and the Learning Trust, governing the provision of education within the Borough.

The quasi-judicial functions of the Council called Regulatory, are carried out by exclusively back-bench Councillors. The Planning Sub-Committee and the Licensing Committee  make independent decisions that oversee both the private and public sector and decide upon a wide range of petitions for permission to build, demolish or otherwise transform the built environment and upon requests for license for the public display of wild animals thru public entertainment to the transport of hazardous waste. The other committees that make up Regulatory are the Standards Committee, Regulatory Committee, Pensions Sub-Committee, and Audit Sub-Committee.

The Mayor, Cabinet, and Regulatory are all held to account by the system of Overview and Scrutiny (O&S). This is formed into an Overview and Scrutiny Board, chaired normally by the leader of the opposition but currently by a Councillor nominated by the Conservative Party group, and the Scrutiny Commissions, the five sub-committees of the Board.
 Children and Young People Scrutiny Commission
 Community Safety and Social Inclusion Scrutiny Commission
 Governance and Resources Scrutiny Commission
 Health in Hackney Scrutiny Commission
 Living in Hackney Scrutiny Commission

2014 elections

At the Hackney Council Election on 22 May 2014 the Labour Party were returned with 50 councillors; a notional increase of one seat. The Conservative Party forms the largest opposition party on the council with four councillors; and the Liberal Democrats have three. The 2014 election was the first fought on new ward boundaries replacing the previous nineteen ward structure with twenty-one wards.

The Labour Party hold all seats in the South of the borough. The Conservative Party held all three seats in Springfield ward, but in the new two member Stamford Hill West ward (made up of parts of the old Lordship and New River wards) the result was split between Labour Party and the Conservative Party. The Liberal Democrats narrowly retained their three seats in Cazenove ward.

In the Mayoral election, Jules Pipe CBE, the Labour Party candidate, won a third consecutive term. He was elected on the first round with 60.4% of the vote. The Green Party came second for the first time with 17.5% of the vote pushing the Conservative Party into third place.

2010 elections

At the Hackney Council election on 6 May 2010 the Labour Party were returned with 50 councillors; winning six additional seats.  The Conservative Party formed the largest opposition party on the council with four councillors elected in 2010; and the Liberal Democrats had three.

At the council's annual general meeting on 18 May 2011, Councillor Linda Kelly crossed the floor of the chamber, relinquishing the Labour Party whip, to take the Conservative Party whip. As a result, the Labour Party were left with forty-nine councillors (plus the mayor) and the Conservative Party with five councillors.

2006 elections

On the 4 May 2006 Hackney Council local elections the Labour Party were returned with forty-four Councillors, winning one seat and losing one. The Conservative Party formed the largest opposition party in the Council with nine Councillors, the Liberal Democrats won three seats, and for only the second time a candidate from the Green Party was elected.

The Labour party majority increased in 2008, following the defection of the Liberal Democrat representative of Cazenove ward Councillor Joseph Stauber to thirty-three.

History

The borough was formed in 1965 from the area of the former metropolitan boroughs of Hackney, Shoreditch and Stoke Newington.

For most of that time it has been a Labour run authority, although there was a period of Conservative administration from 1968 to 1972

Controversies 
In 1990, the United Kingdom Conservative government, headed by Prime Minister Margaret Thatcher introduced a poll tax, which was very unpopular. The Hackney Labour Council introduced the new tax, the Community Charge at a rate of £499 per adult resident, which was £200 higher than mandated by the Prime Minister. This contributed to the Poll Tax Riots of 1990 which subsequently broke out in Hackney, greater London and other areas of the United Kingdom.

In 1996, Kingsmead Primary School head Jane Brown refused to issue tickets for pupils to attend a Romeo and Juliet ballet on grounds that it was "entirely about heterosexual love".

There was a brief period when John McCafferty led a minority administration followed by a loose coalition of Hackney New Labour, the Liberal Democrats and the Conservatives.  By the 1998 election all but two of the Hackney New Labour councillors defected to either the Liberal Democrats or the Conservatives, and a coalition was launched after the council between the Liberal Democrats, the Conservatives and two Green Party councillors.  After this there was a coalition between Labour led by Jules Pipe and the Conservatives led by Eric Ollerenshaw.  After the 2002 borough elections, Labour returned as the majority party.

Mark Trotter Affair

In the 1990s, there was a period of changing coalitions in the government and councilors of Hackney following the Mark Trotter affair, known as "Trottergate", involving allegations of a cover up over a child abuse scandal involving Mark Trotter, a Labour activist and trade unionist who continued working in the borough despite a number of complaints about his behaviour leading to allegations that he had been shown favouritism by some of the members of the ruling Labour group.

The Labour Party members of the council split between councillors following the former mayor Nick Tallentire (which called themselves "The Hackney New Labour Group") and councillors following the former council leader John McCafferty, who was eventually backed by the national Labour party. Mark Trotter was a children's social service employee of the Hackney and Liverpool Councils who had been reported four times for child abuse and multiple times for suspicion of abuse, and was reported for beating his boyfriend and illegally evicting him from their shared council-provided house.

An independent inquiry carried out by John Barrat stated that the reason why Mark Trotter was not properly investigated by the council or terminated was "the fact that he [Mark Trotter] had quite an influential position in the trade union in a council where trade unions have a lot of power." Mark Trotter died of an AIDS-related illness in 1995, shortly before the police informed the Hackney council they were about to prosecute him for sexually abusing five boys in 1980–81 when he lived in Merseyside, UK. None of the known victims, twelve in all, contracted HIV/AIDS from the alleged abuse.

Electoral wards
The nineteen wards in that make up the borough are mostly made up of four polling districts, the exception being Dalston ward with five. Most are named after geographical locations or features with the exceptions of Chatham and Stoke Newington Central centred on Stoke Newington High Street, part of the Roman Ermine Street, the Central part both separating the surrounding parts of Stoke Newington that are parts of neighbouring wards and also apeing Hackney Central. The only ward named after street is Clissold for Clissold Crescent and not Clissold Park located in neighbouring Lordship ward. Most are named for the hamlets originally found there, Haggerston, Hoxton, and Wick, country estates between the hamlets, Brownswood after Brownswood Park and Lordship after Lordship Park, or the planned developments themselves, Cazenove, De Beauvoir, and Kings Park. Three are named after parks, Hackney Downs, Springfield Park, Hackney, and Victoria Park, East London although after a boundary change there no longer is any part of Victoria Park within the Borough. Two are named after bridges the first of the River Lea and the other Queensbridge after a bridge over the Regents Canal. Finally two are named after the two railway stations Hackney Central railway station and Dalston Junction.

As a result of a review of the borough's ward boundaries by the Local Government Boundary Commission for England, completed in 2013,  the May 2014 election will be fought across revised boundaries comprising twenty-one wards.

The wards from May 2002 to May 2014 are:
Brownswood
Cazenove
Chatham
Clissold
Dalston
De Beauvoir
Hackney Central
Hackney Downs
Haggerston
Hoxton
King's Park
Leabridge
Lordship
New River
Queensbridge
Springfield
Stoke Newington Central
Victoria
Wick

External links
Official Hackney Council Website
Registering for the electoral register in Hackney
www.hackney-labour.org.uk
www.hackneyconservatives.com
www.hackneylibdems.org.uk
www.hackney.greenparty.org.uk
www.hackneyindependent.org

References